The Agricultural Act of 2014 (also known as the 2014 U.S. Farm Bill, formerly the Federal Agriculture Reform and Risk Management Act of 2013) is an act of Congress that authorizes nutrition and agriculture programs in the United States for the years of 2014-2018. The bill authorizes $956 billion in spending over the next ten years.

The bill passed in the United States House of Representatives on January 29, 2014, and the United States Senate on February 4, 2014 during the 113th United States Congress. U.S. President Barack Obama signed the bill into law on February 7, 2014. The bill is considered two years late, since farm bills are traditionally passed every five years. The previous farm bill, Food, Conservation, and Energy Act of 2008, expired in 2012.

Background

Farm bills

In the United States, the farm bill is the primary agricultural and food policy tool of the federal government.  The comprehensive omnibus bill is passed every five years or so by the United States Congress and deals with both agriculture and all other affairs under the purview of the United States Department of Agriculture. It usually makes amendments and suspensions to provisions of permanent law, reauthorizes, amends, or repeals provisions of preceding temporary agricultural acts, and puts forth new policy provisions for a limited time into the future.  Beginning in 1973, farm bills have included titles on commodity programs, trade, rural development, farm credit, conservation, agricultural research, food and nutrition programs, marketing, etc. Farm bills can be highly controversial and can impact international trade, environmental conservation, food safety, and the well-being of rural communities. The agricultural subsidy programs mandated by the farm bills are the subject of intense debate both within the U.S. and internationally.

The farm bill was first created during the Great Depression to give financial assistance to farmers who were struggling due to an excess crop supply creating low prices, and also to control and ensure an adequate food supply. The first farm bill, known as the Agriculture Adjustment Act (AAA), was passed by Congress in 1933 as a part of Franklin D. Roosevelt's New Deal. The Food, Conservation, and Energy Act of 2008 is the most recent farm bill, prior to this one.

Provisions of the bill
The bill includes cuts to Supplemental Nutrition Assistance Program (SNAP), commonly known as "food stamps". According to The New York Times, the $8 billion in cuts will mean that 850,000 households will lose $90/month in benefits. However, the bill increases funding to food banks by $200 million. SNAP is the largest portion of spending in the bill. The $8 billion in cuts comes from setting a minimum of $20 per year for the Low Income Home Energy Assistance Program (LIHEAP) to receive the Standard Utility Allowance (SUA) deduction, disallow medical marijuana as a deduction and ruling that lottery winners and persons convicted of certain crimes (murder, aggravated sexual abuse, sexual assault, and sexual exploitation and other abuse of children) can't get food stamps. However, the bill would start a new pilot program to encourage people on food stamps to try to find jobs.

The bill places income caps on farm subsidies, has a price support program for dairy farmers and ends direct payment subsidies, which paid farmers whether or not they actually grew any crops. This subsidy had cost $5 billion a year. The Agricultural Act of 2014 also contained the Christmas Tree Research and Promotion Order, a commodity checkoff program that established the Christmas Tree Promotion Board.

Spending
According to Brad Plumer at The Washington Post, the spending in the bill (FY 2014-2023) breaks down in the following manner:

In total, this spending represents about 2.1% of projected federal spending over that time period.

Congressional Budget Office report

This summary is based largely on the summary provided by the Congressional Budget Office about the effects on direct spending and revenues of the conference agreement on H.R. 2642, as reported on January 27, 2014. This is a public domain source.

The Congressional Budget Office (CBO) estimates that direct spending stemming from the programs authorized by the conference agreement would total $956 billion over the 2014-2023 period, of which $756 billion would be for nutrition programs. Relative to spending and revenues projected under the CBO’s May 2013 baseline, the CBO estimates that enacting the conference agreement would lower budget deficits by $16.6 billion over that 10-year period. The CBO reported that original House version, Federal Agriculture Reform and Risk Management Act of 2013 (H.R. 1947; 113th Congress), would have reduced direct spending by $51.8 billion and increased revenues by $60 million. The original Senate version, Agriculture Reform, Food, and Jobs Act of 2013 (S. 954; 113th Congress), would have decreased direct spending by $17.7 billion and increased revenues by $50 million.

Most spending under the legislation would stem from provisions regarding nutrition (title IV), crop insurance (title XI), commodity programs (title I), and conservation programs (title II).

Title I —  Commodities. CBO estimates that enacting title I would reduce spending on commodity programs by $14.3 billion over the 2014-2023 period, $3 billion to $4 billion less than under the House- and Senate- passed bills. The conference agreement, as well as both the House and Senate bills, would end fixed payments and certain other existing forms of price and income support to producers. They would all establish new programs that would require producers to choose between price supports or a guarantee of some of their expected revenue.

Title IV —  Nutrition. Title IV of the conference agreement would reduce nutrition spending by $8 billion over the 2014-2023 period, CBO estimates. The House-passed bill would reduce such spending by $39 billion over the 10-year period. It includes two provisions not contained in the conference agreement that would reduce spending on the Supplemental Nutrition Assistance Program (SNAP) by restricting the definition of categorical eligibility for the program and reducing the number of waivers from work requirements available for certain adult SNAP recipients. The Senate-passed bill would reduce nutrition spending by $4 billion over the next 10 years, about half the reduction in the conference agreement. It contains a proposal to limit heating and cooling allowances for SNAP participants that is less restrictive than the provision include in the conference agreement.

Title XI — Crop Insurance. The conference agreement's provisions on crop insurance would increase costs by $5.7 billion over the 2014-2023 period, CBO estimates. Total spending for crop insurance over the 2014-2023 period would increase by about $9 billion under the House-passed legislation and by about $5 billion under the Senate-passed legislation.

This estimate does not include the additional discretionary spending for agricultural programs that would result from implementing the conference agreement; such spending would be subject to future appropriation actions. CBO also has not reviewed the conference agreement for intergovernmental or private-sector mandates.

Procedural history

Legislation in 2013

On June 17, 2013, President of the United States Barack Obama released a statement of administration policy announcing that the Administration "strongly opposes" the Federal Agriculture Reform and Risk Management Act of 2013. The statement provided three specific criticisms. First, the bill would cut some of the funding for Supplemental Nutrition Assistance Program (SNAP), a federal program that provides money for food for low income Americans. Second, the bill would need meet the president's expectations for commodity and crop reforms. Third, the bill would not provide funding for renewable energy. The memo concludes with the statement that "if the President were presented with H.R. 1947, his senior advisors would recommend that he veto the bill." On June 20, 2013, the bill was rejected by the House in a vote of 195–234. Only 24 Democrats voted in favor of the bill, with most voting against due to its cuts to the Supplemental Nutrition Assistance Program.  62 Republicans voted against the bill, defecting from their own party. Comments made by the House Republican leadership immediately following the vote suggested that they had expected more Democratic support. Since they hadn't received it, they indicated they would be rewriting the bill to appeal more to the conservative Republicans whose votes they lost.

In light of the failure of the House version of the farm bill to pass, attention has shifted to focus on the reaction of the House to the Senate-passed draft farm bill, known as the Agriculture Reform, Food, and Jobs Act of 2013.  This is the bill that was introduced into the United States Senate on May 14, 2013 by Sen. Debbie Stabenow (D-MI).  The bill was considered on the Senate floor on May 21–23, and June 3–4, June 6, and June 10, 2013.  On June 10, 2013, the bill passed in the Senate 66-27 with support of the president. Only two Democrats voted against their party: Senator Sheldon Whitehouse (D-RI) and Senator Jack Reed (D-RI).  Eighteen Republicans voted in favor of the bill. However, the Senate bill failed to pass in the House, so the two chambers organized a conference committee. One of the major provisions of the Agriculture Reform, Food, and Jobs Act of 2013 was a $4 billion cut to the Supplemental Nutrition Assistance Program, a controversial provision, with some Democrats arguing that the cuts were too large, while some Republicans arguing that the cuts did not do enough to cut the deficit.

The second version of the Federal Agriculture Reform and Risk Management Act of 2013 (version H.R. 2642) was introduced into the United States House of Representatives on July 10, 2013 by Lucas. On July 11, 2013, the House voted to pass the bill 216–208, after several failed attempts were made to delay or amend the bill. The United States Senate received the bill on July 16, 2013. On July 18, 2013, the Senate voted to amend the bill by replacing most of it with language from their proposed farm bill, the Agriculture Reform, Food, and Jobs Act of 2013. The amended bill passed the Senate by unanimous consent on July 18, 2013 and the Senate requested a conference with the House on the bill. The Senate selected Senators Stabenow, Leahy, Harkin, Baucus, Brown, Klobuchar, Bennet, Cochran, Chambliss, Roberts, Boozman, and Hoeven as their conferees.

Conference committee
Eventually, on October 12, 2013, the House agreed to a conference on the bill and conferees were chosen: 
 Steve Southerland (R-FL)
 Marcia Fudge (D-OH)
 Dave Camp (R-OH)
 Sam Johnson (R-TX)
 Sander Levin (D-Mich.)
 Ed Royce (R-CA)
 Tom Marino (R-PA.)
 Eliot Engel (D-NY)
 Frank Lucas (R-OK)
 Steve King (R-IA)
 Randy Neugebauer (R-TX) 
 Michael D. Rogers (R-Ala.)
 Mike Conaway (R-TX)
 Glenn Thompson (R-PA)
 Austin Scott (R-GA)
 Rick Crawford (R-AR)
 Martha Roby (R-Ala.)
 Kristi Noem (R-SD)
 Jeff Denham (R-CA)
 Rodney Davis (R-Ill.)
 Collin Peterson (D-MN)
 Mike McIntyre (D-NC) 
 Jim Costa (D-CA)
 Tim Walz (D-MN)
 Kurt Schrader (D-Ore.) 
 Jim McGovern (D-MA)
 Suzan DelBene (D-WA)
 Gloria Negrete McLeod (D-CA)
 Filemon Vela Jr. (D-TX)

On January 27, 2014, the Conference Committee report was released. On January 29, 2014, the House voted 251-166 to pass the bill. In the House, a majority of Republicans voted in favor of the bill (163-62) and the Democrats split almost evenly (89-103). The Senate then voted 68–32 on February 4, 2014, to approve the full five-year farm bill, sending it to President Barack Obama to be signed into law.

Debate and discussion
Senator Debbie Stabenow argued in favor of the Senate bill because it both reduced the deficit and supported "16 million people who depend on agriculture for their jobs".

The Senate bill was opposed by groups focusing on hunger due to its reduction in spending on food stamps.  It was also criticized by groups such as the Heritage Foundation for including a system of crop insurance that were less about helping farmers in the event of a true disaster and more of an income support system.

Senator John McCain (R-AZ) criticized the Senate bill for containing a catfish inspection program that he believes duplicates one that is already conducted by the Food and Drug Administration.

Both Speaker of the House John Boehner and Majority Leader Eric Cantor supported the bill and asked other Republicans to do so. However, both men indicated they would have preferred additional changes.

On January 29, 2014, after passage in the House, it was considered "unclear" what President Obama thought of the farm bill because he had previously "signaled his opposition to any bill that cut food stamps and expanded crop insurance."

Feeding America said that the cuts to food stamps would "result in 34 lost meals per month for the affected households."

See also
List of bills in the 113th United States Congress

References

Further reading
 Bosso, Christopher. Framing the Farm Bill: Interests, Ideology, and Agricultural Act of 2014 (University Press of Kansas, 2017).
  Orden, David  and Carl Zulauf. "Political economy of the 2014 farm bill." American Journal of Agricultural Economics 97.5 (2015): 1298-1311. online online]
 Zulauf, Carl  and David Orden, "The US Agricultural Act of 2014: Overview and Analysis." (International Food Policy Research Institute discussion paper 01393, 2014) online

External links

 ; 
 Agricultural Act of 2014 (PDF/details) as amended in the GPO Statute Compilations collection
 Agricultural Act of 2014 (PDF/details) as enacted in the US Statutes at Large
Library of Congress - Thomas H.R. 2642
beta.congress.gov H.R. 2642
GovTrack.us H.R. 2642
OpenCongress.org H.R. 2642
WashingtonWatch.com H.R. 2642
House Republican Conference's Legislative Digest on the conference report on H.R. 2642

Acts of the 113th United States Congress
Agricultural economics
Agricultural subsidies
United States federal agriculture legislation